Fly Like an Eagle may refer to:

 Fly Like an Eagle (album), 1976, by Steve Miller Band
 "Fly Like an Eagle" (song), by Steve Miller Band
 "Fly Like an Eagle" (Stereophonics song), from Kind, 2019
 "Fly Like an Eagle", a song from The Marshall Tucker Band's 1977 album, Carolina Dreams 
 "Fly Like an Eagle", a song from Ten's 1997 album The Robe
 "Fly Like an Eagle", a song from Respect (Shaquille O'Neal album), 1998
 "Fly Like an Eagle", a 1994 episode of Takin' Over the Asylum
 "Fly Like an Eagle", a 2015 episode of Lost in Transmission

See also
 "Fly Like the Eagle", song by Agnetha Fältskog & Ola Håkansson from That's Me (album)